Andrew Todd (born 15 April 1981) is a former professional rugby league footballer who played in the 2000s. He played at representative level for Scotland, and at club level for the Edinburgh Eagles.

International honours
Andy Todd won 2 caps for Scotland while at Edinburgh Eagles in 2007 in losses against France and Wales, respectively.

References

Edinburgh Eagles players
Living people
Place of birth missing (living people)
Scotland national rugby league team players
1981 births
Rugby league wingers